Travlivka is a rural locality (a village) in Myaksinskoye Rural Settlement, Cherepovetsky District, Vologda Oblast, Russia. The population was 13 as of 2002.

Geography 
Travlivka is located 42 km southeast of Cherepovets (the district's administrative centre) by road. Stepantsevo is the nearest rural locality.

References 

Rural localities in Cherepovetsky District